
Gmina Kiszkowo is a rural gmina (administrative district) in Gniezno County, Greater Poland Voivodeship, in west-central Poland.

It includes the village of Dąbrówka Kościelna, whose church has for centuries been a destination for Roman Catholic pilgrims.

The gmina contains part of the protected area called Puszcza Zielonka Landscape Park.

Villages
Gmina Kiszkowo contains the villages and settlements of Berkowo, Brudzewko, Charzewo, Dąbrówka Kościelna, Darmoszewo, Głębokie, Gniewkowo, Imiołki, Kamionek, Karczewko, Karczewo, Kiszkowo, Łagiewniki Kościelne, Łubowice, Łubowiczki, Myszki, Olekszyn, Rybieniec, Rybno, Skrzetuszewo, Sławno, Sroczyn, Turostówko, Turostowo, Ujazd, Węgorzewo and Wola Łagiewnicka.

Neighbouring gminas
Gmina Kiszkowo is bordered by the gminas of Kłecko, Łubowo, Murowana Goślina, Pobiedziska and Skoki.

References
Polish official population figures 2006

Kiszkowo
Gniezno County